Fulgoraria megaspira is a species of sea snail, a marine gastropod mollusk in the family Volutidae, the volutes.

Subspecies
 Fulgoraria megaspira magna Kuroda & Habe, 1950
 Fulgoraria megaspira prevostiana (Crosse, 1878)

Description
The length of the shell attains 103 mm.

Distribution
This marine species occurs off Japan.

References

 Crosse, H., 1878. - Diagnoses generi novi Pneumonoponorum et Volutae novae. Journal de Conchyliologie 26: 163-166

External links
 Sowerby, G. B., I. (1844). Descriptions of six new species of Voluta. Proceedings of the Zoological Society of London. 1844: 149–152.
 MNHN, Paris: syntype

Volutidae
Gastropods described in 1844